The following is a list of California unemployment statistics.

Many of the counties with the lowest unemployment rates had relatively high levels of income. They were also located in Northern California, with two exceptions: Orange and San Luis Obispo counties. The counties with the highest unemployment rates were generally located in inland areas and had lower levels of income.

Unemployment rate has reached 12.4 percent in 2010 which is highest recorded from 1976. Unemployment rates in California reached historic lows in 2000 and 2006. Unemployment rates in California were relatively low during the early 2000s but increased drastically in late 2000s

Statewide unemployment 

Data released December 13, 2017 for November 2017.

Unemployment by county 

Data released March 7, 2014 for January 2014, except population data (released 2012).

Historical statewide unemployment rates 

The unemployment rates in this table are annual averages without seasonal adjustment. The 1976-1989 rates are based on the March 2004 benchmark and were last updated April 26, 2005. The 1990-2012 rates are based on the March 2006 benchmark.

See also 

 Economy of California
 List of U.S. states by unemployment rate
 Unemployment in the United States

References 

Unemployment in the United States
unemployment statistics